Austroscolia is a genus of wasps belonging to the family Scoliidae, subfamily Scoliinae. It was formerly classified as a subgenus of Scolia.

Species
The following species are included in Austroscolia:

 Austroscolia commixta Turner, R.E. 1909
 Austroscolia ignota  (Betrem, 1928)
 Austroscolia nitida (Smith, 1855)
 Austroscolia nitida varifrons (Cameron, 1905)
 Austroscolia ruficeps (Smith, 1855)
 Austroscolia soror (Smith, 1855)

References

Hymenoptera genera
Scoliidae